Alexandru Târnovan (born 27 July 1995) is a Romanian footballer who plays as a striker.

Club career

Steaua București
On 31 December 2013, it was announced that Târnovan has signed for Steaua in a deal worth €300k with Viitorul club getting 20% on any future sales.

Honours
Steaua București:
Romanian Liga I: 2013–14
League Cup: 2015–16
Hermannstadt
Cupa României: Runner-up 2017–18

Statistics 

Statistics accurate as of match played 15 October 2016

References

External links
 
 

1995 births
Living people
Sportspeople from Bistrița
Romanian footballers
Association football forwards
Liga I players
Liga II players
FC Viitorul Constanța players
FC Steaua București players
CS Gaz Metan Mediaș players
FC Universitatea Cluj players
FC Botoșani players
FC Hermannstadt players
21st-century Romanian people